The 1878 Tamworth by-election was fought on 24 April 1878.  The byelection was fought due to the resignation of the incumbent, Conservative MP, Robert William Hanbury, in order to contest North Staffordshire.  It was won by the Liberal candidate Hamar Bass.

References

1878 in England
Politics of Tamworth, Staffordshire
1878 elections in the United Kingdom
By-elections to the Parliament of the United Kingdom in Staffordshire constituencies
19th century in Staffordshire